Saša Matić (born 25 September 1993) is a Swedish footballer.

Career

Club career
Matic grew up in Skärholmen and started playing football in Djurgårdens IF when he was five. He was allowed to play two training matches with the A-team before the 2013 season but was then loaned to the division 2 club Arameiska-Syrianska IF. Prior to the 2014 season, he signed a permanent one-year contract with the club.

Ahead of the 2015 season, Matic signed for Huddinge IF. Matic made his division 1 debut on April 11, 2015 in a 2-0 loss to Carlstad United BK, where he was substituted in the 62nd minute. In total, Matic scored 14 goals in 25 games during the season.

In February 2016, Matic was signed by the Superettan club AFC Eskilstuna. Before the 2017 season, the club was promoted to the Allsvenskan and changed its name to AFC Eskilstuna. Matic made his Allsvenskan debut on April 2, 2017 in a 3-1 loss against GIF Sundsvall

In the summer of 2019, Matic signed for Syrianska FC. He left the club at the end of the year.

References

External links 
 

Swedish footballers
1993 births
Living people
Allsvenskan players
Superettan players
Ettan Fotboll players
Division 2 (Swedish football) players
Djurgårdens IF Fotboll players
Huddinge IF players
AFC Eskilstuna players
Syrianska FC players
Association football forwards